Place names in China primarily refers to Han Chinese names, but also to those used by China's minorities.

Origins
In his study of place-names in China, J. E. Spencer notes that "although Chinese names indicate both domestic cultural and geographical influences, they almost never indicate cultural influence from other parts of the world", a tendency that also appeared to be characteristic of Chinese place-names in Singapore.

Tibetan, Mongolian, Uighur and tribal minorities of China's names are phonetically transcribed into Chinese.

In Chinese grammar
Names for places in China, when referred to in Chinese contain a class identifier. In English this is often translated, while the rest of the name is not. The class identifier in Chinese is placed at the end, in English with the exceptions of mountains and lakes the identifier is placed at the end too. For names of lakes and mountains "X Lake"  / "Lake X" and "X Mountain" / "Mount X" both is used.

Some mountain ranges like Tian Shan are referred to English by the Chinese name. "Tian" means sky or heaven and "Shan" means mountain(s), so Tian Shan literally translates as the "Heaven Mountains".

List of class names 
E = English, C = Chinese, P = Pinyin

Directions
Chinese reckon five directions:

 East: 东, Dong — e.g., Guangdong (广东), "Eastern Part of the Expanse"
 West: 西, Xi — e.g., Xi'an (西安), "Western Pacified Area"
 South: 南, Nan — e.g., Hainan (海南), "South of the Sea"
 North: 北, Bei — e.g., Beijing (北京), "Northern Capital"
 Central/Middle: 中, Zhong —e.g., Hanzhong (汉中), "Middle of the Han"

From the early concept of yin and yang (阴 and 阳), originally based upon exposure to the sun, many placenames also incorporate them. Old Luoyang was located on the north bank of the Luo. Old Hanyang was located on the north bank of the Han, while the eponymous county seat of Hanyin was located on the south bank. When a placename is derived from a mountain, however, these positions are reversed: the yang side is the mountain's south face and the yin side its north.

See also
 Place names of Hong Kong

References

 
Chinese language
China
Place name etymologies